Aina Calvo i Sastre (born in 1969), is a Spanish academic and politician, former Mayoress of Palma de Mallorca and current Delegate of the Government in the Balearic Islands since February 2020. She also served as Director of Spanish Agency for International Development Cooperation, from 2018 to 2020.

Born in Palma de Mallorca, in 1969, she resided in Zaragoza for family work purposes until 1983, when she returned to Palma. She studied at Glasgow first as a graduate student with an Erasmus scholarship and, later, as a professor at the University of Strathclyde.

Is a Doctor of Pedagogy and professor of the Department of Educational Sciences of the University of the Balearic Islands in a situation of special services and visiting professor at the University of Edinburgh. In 2003 joined the PSIB-PSOE, being elected as a member of the Parliament of the Balearic Islands. Calvo has been part of the Ministry of Foreign Affairs and Cooperation as Assistant Director General of Cooperation and Cultural Promotion of the Spanish Agency for International Cooperation between 2004 and 2006, when PSIB candidate is designated to the City Council of Palma de Mallorca. In the municipal elections of 27 May 2007 her candidacy is second, but manages to form a government thanks to a pact with UM. However, in February 2010 the government pact was broken by expelling the UM Councilmen after being suspected of corruption, ruling the rest of the term in minority. She lost municipal elections on 22 May 2011 retaining as spokeswoman of the Municipal Group.

During the 38th Congress of the PSOE, she formed part of the team of Carme Chacón in her candidacy to the General Secretariat of the PSOE, which was defeated by Alfredo Pérez Rubalcaba.

In March 2012, resigned as Secretary General of the Socialist Group of Palma. However, after the resignation of her successor,  postulated to direct the local group again. On July 6, 2012, she was elected General Secretary of the Socialist Group of Palma, obtaining 64.7% of the votes against 35% of his rival Jaume Garau.

References

1969 births
Living people
Spanish Socialist Workers' Party politicians
Women mayors of places in Spain
People from Palma de Mallorca
Members of the Parliament of the Balearic Islands
21st-century Spanish women politicians
Spanish municipal councillors
Mayors of places in the Balearic Islands